The national emblem of Brunei is a national symbol featured prominently on the flag of Brunei. It was adopted in 1940. There are five main components to the national emblem: the flag, the royal parasol (ceremonial umbrella), the wings, the hands, and the crescent.

Below the crescent is a banner; both are inscribed with yellow lettering in Arabic:

Design

All elements on the emblem are red. On some versions they have black outlines; others have colourless outlines.
 The small swallowtail flag and parasol, regalia of the sultanate's monarchy, have been the royal insignia since the creation of the emblem. 
 The wings symbolise protection of justice, tranquility, prosperity and peace.
 Below these is the crescent, a symbol of Islam, the state religion of Brunei.
 On the sides, the upturned hands indicate the government's duty is to preserve and promote the welfare of the citizens and to protect the people.

Personal emblem of the Sultan

After the Constitution was enacted in 1959 the Sultan of Brunei adopted a different emblem from the emblem of state, in that the two hands were superseded by two golden sejant cats (kuching emas). At his coronation in 1968, Sultan Hassanal Bolkiah used a crown (mahkota) with an original design due it is based on the brocade turbans used by previous sultans. It is made of precious metal, decorated with pendilia and a sarpech consisting of a crescent-and-ten-pointed star and topped with a seven-pointed ornament.

An excerpt from the Quran in Arabic text is inscribed upon the crescent, the opening verse of the surah Al-Mulk: ; Tabāraka al-ladhī bi-yadihi al-mulku, meaning "Blessed is He in Whose hand is the kingdom". 

Around 1999 a highly elaborate achievement was adopted. It maintained the inscribed crescent, since that time vert, and the winged umbrella as core elements but the Sultan's crown was added over them. On the yellow standard of the Sultan, the emblem is all red.

Past emblems

References

National symbols of Brunei
Brunei
Brunei
Brunei
Brunei